Klyuyev or Klyuev is a Russian surname. Notable people with the surname include:

Aleksandr Klyuyev, Russian football player
Andriy Klyuyev, Ukrainian businessman and politician
Boris Klyuyev, Russian actor
Denis Klyuyev, Russian football player
Nikolai Klyuev, Russian poet
Serhiy Klyuyev, Ukrainian businessman and politician
Yury Klyuyev, Russian speed skater

Russian-language surnames